Herambasuta (Devanagari:हेरम्बसुत, IAST:), was a Tantric exponent who belonged to the vamachara Ganapatya sect. The tenth century work  attributed to certain  mentions the cult of  led by Herambasuta. In Tantric context, food is deliberately left in the mouth in order to render them ritually impure. According to the scripture mentioned above, Herambasuta held many unorthodox views, and the worship included .

The form of worship Herambasuta expounded was : there was no caste restriction, promiscuity was allowed and the followers wore a red mark on the forehead. According to R. G. Bhandarkar it was an imitation of Kaula form of worship.

Notes

Ganesha
Hindu tantra
Tantric practices
Indian Hindu monks
Hindu philosophers and theologians